Adeline Records was an American record label that was formed in Oakland, California in late 1997 and closed in August 2017.

History 
In 1997, Adeline Records was founded by Billie Joe Armstrong, lead singer of Green Day, Screw 32's Doug Sangalang, Green Day guitarist Jason White, and professional skateboarder Jim Thiebaud. It was named after a street (Adeline Street) that runs from The Port of Oakland through West Oakland and Emeryville, terminating at Ward St and Shattuck Ave in Berkeley.

Green Day's management company, Pat Magnarella Management, took over ownership of the label and ran it from the company's office in San Diego for many years.

The label was closed in 2017. In July 2017, Pat Magnarella split from Green Day having managed them for over 21 years. Shortly thereafter Adeline Records abruptly closed down.

Merchandise 
Adeline Records also sold clothing for men and women as well as other clothing, providing advertising for the label. The range was called Adeline Street and included clothes (skirts, tops, underwear, dresses, hats, hoodies, jackets), accessories and jewellery for men, women, and children. The Adeline street logo is a skull and crossbones with a heart in the center of the crossed bones in pink for women and khaki for men. The clothing line ceased trading in 2008. The company posted the following statement at the time: "Adeline Street has decided not to move forward with future designs while Billie Joe and the guys are working hard on their follow up to 'American Idiot.'"

Bands 

The Frustrators
Green Day (vinyl releases only)
Stickup Kid
Jesse Malin
Living with Lions
Look Mexico
One Time Angels
One Man Army
Pinhead Gunpowder
Timmy Curran
White Wives
AFI
Agent 51
Broadway Calls
Fetish
Fleshies
The Frisk
The Hours
The Influents
The Living End
The Network
The Soviettes
The Thumbs
Emily's Army

See also 

 List of record labels

References

External links 
 

 
American record labels
Vanity record labels
Record labels established in 1997
Punk record labels
1997 establishments in California